R.C.M.P. was a Canadian television drama series about the Royal Canadian Mounted Police. The series ran a single season, consisting of 39 weekly half-hour episodes that aired from 28 October 1959 to 19 October 1960 on CBC.

Cast 
The series starred French-Canadian actor Gilles Pelletier as Corporal Jacques Gagnier, who was in charge of the rural northern Shamattaw station. English-Canadian actor Don Francks played Constable Bill Mitchell, and American actor John Perkins played Constable Frank Scott.

Actors in supporting roles were Hugh Webster, Murray Westgate, Robert Christie, James Doohan, John Drainie, Katherine Blake, and Alfie Scopp. A nine-member indigenous family, from a grandmother to an infant, were flown in from the Hudson Bay area to appear in some episodes.

Cooperation of Royal Canadian Mounted Police
The series had the cooperation of the Royal Canadian Mounted Police, and the producers were allowed access to their case files. Charles Rivett-Carnac, who had 36 years of active service before being appointed as RCMP commissioner, worked closely with the producers.

Earl Rettig, the president of NBC division California National Productions, which syndicated R.C.M.P. in the United States, stated "Hollywood motion pictures and television producers for years have been negotiating in vain for a working agreement with the Royal Canadian Mounted Police. This is why CNP feels very fortunate in having secured rights to the series."

Production 
The series was created by Canadian film-maker Radford Crawley in collaboration with the Canadian Broadcasting Corporation, the BBC and the Australian Broadcasting Commission. It was shot on a new soundstage at Old Chelsea, a community of Chelsea, Quebec, and on location in Aylmer, Quebec and Outlook, Saskatchewan. The series took place in the fictional western Canadian town of Shamattawa, a Cree name meaning 'the meeting of the rivers'.

The main writers for the series were George Salverson, Munroe Scott and Vincent Tilsley of the BBC, who also acted as script editor. Music was composed by William McCauley. The CBC aired the series at a cost of $8,000 per episode, and the BBC paid $10,000 per episode.

The series had a budget of $1,400,000, and took a year to film. The producers bought an old airplane without wings, and mounted it in a field. When there wasn’t enough natural snow, snow was shoveled in front of the airplane’s engine to produce a blizzard effect. Special heaters were used outdoors to keep the cameras operating in freezing weather.

R.C.M.P. was realistic in portraying small-town Canadian life, and often had the look of a documentary. The series used the characters’ rural isolation, the changing weather conditions, and the cultural differences between whites and natives as focal points for episode stories.

Crawley had hoped to sell the series to a United States television network, and was disappointed with needing to settle for less profitable syndication status, but the American television networks weren't interested in buying a foreign series unless they were involved in its production. Though Crawley had hired Hollywood-based Bernard Girard as head of production, that did not satisfy the U.S. networks, who wanted more control over the series they broadcast, so the series was syndicated to United States television stations.

Episodes

Broadcast 
The series aired on CBC in Canada, premiering on 28 October 1959, and airing its finale episode on 19 October 1960. In the United Kingdom, the series aired on BBC beginning in July 1960. In the United States the series aired in broadcast syndication.

R.C.M.P. was dubbed into the French, Spanish, Italian and German languages, and was broadcast is numerous European and South American countries.

References

External links 

R.C.M.P. at the Classic TV Archive
R.C.M.P. at Canadian Communication Foundation

1959 Canadian television series debuts
1960 Canadian television series endings
Black-and-white Canadian television shows
Canadian crime drama television series
CBC Television original programming
Royal Canadian Mounted Police in fiction